Lord of the Isles is a Scottish title of nobility.

Lord of the Isles may also refer to:

Transportation

Railways
 Lord of the Isles, a Great Western Railway Iron Duke Class steam locomotive in use from 1851 to 1884
 Lord of the Isles, a Great Western Railway 3031 Class steam locomotive in use from 1891 to 1915

Ships
 Lord of the Isles (clipper), 1853 British tea clipper
 MV Lord of the Isles, the Calmac ferry

Other uses 
 Lord of the Isles (David Drake), the series of fantasy novels by David Drake
 The Lord of the Isles, a narrative poem by Sir Walter Scott